Derangabad (also Romanized as Derangābād) is a village in Darzab Rural District, in the Central District of Mashhad County, Razavi Khorasan Province, Iran. At the 2006 census, its population was 232, in 57 families.

References 

Populated places in Mashhad County